Ku-Maloob-Zaap is an oil field in Mexico. It is made up of three relatively large fields, Ku, Maloob, and Zaap, which are located to the immediate northwest of the Cantarell field.

Ku-Maloob-Zaap is located offshore in the Bay of Campeche, off the coast of Tabasco,  from Ciudad del Carmen. It was discovered by PEMEX, Mexico's national oil company, in 1979.
The Ku, Maloob, and Zaap fields produce from the Kimmeridgian, Lower Paleocene-Upper Cretaceous, and Middle Eocene reservoirs. Total reserves of the field have been put at 4.9 billion barrels.

Production history
The Ku field was discovered in 1980, the Maloob field in 1984 and Zaap in 1991. First oil from the Ku field was produced in 1981.

The KMZ development included drilling 82 wells, four of which are nitrogen injectors and installation of 17 oil platforms: seven drilling, four production, four accommodation, one telecommunication and one processing.

This target was met by November 2009 when oil production reached . The field produced  crude oil in 2010. This new rate of production and the decline in production at the Cantarell Field made Ku-Maloob-Zaap Mexico's most productive oil field.

KMZ is among the company’s most profitable producing assets, according to Welligence Energy Analytics. Pemex reported average production costs of $10.37/boe at KMZ as of end-2019.

On 2 July 2021, Mexico's state-owned oil company PEMEX suffered an undersea gas pipeline rupture in the Ku-Maloob-Zaap field. The leak and subsequent fire lasted for five hours.

Then, in August, an explosion and fire on the E-Ku-A2 platform killed at least five workers and injured more. This platform is also part of the Ku-Maloob-Zaap complex.

Production decline
Production in the Ku-Maloob-Zaap fields has entered a declining phase. The uncertainty created by Covid-19 contributed to the decline in production.
The field produced  in 2022 which is roughly 40% of Pemex total output.

To maintain production in the Ku Maloob Zaap field, PEMEX has adopted techniques such as management of production limits and nitrogen injection.

See also

 List of oil fields

References

External links
Proyecto Ku-Maloob-Zaap, en la Sonda de Campeche

Oil fields in Mexico
Pemex
Gulf Coast of Mexico
Petroleum industry in the Gulf of Mexico
Geography of Campeche